The plain flowerpecker (Dicaeum minullum) is a bird in the family Dicaeidae. The species was first described by Robert Swinhoe in 1870. It is found in the central Himalayas, through western Indonesia to Taiwan.

Description
These birds are tiny (9 cm long) and there is no marked difference between the males and females. The subspecies found in northeastern India, extending into Myanmar, Laos and southern China is called olivaceum by earlier authors but is treated by Pamela C. Rasmussen as a separate species Dicaeum minullum (which includes the population minullum from Hainan Island and is now termed as the plain flowerpecker in the more restricted sense).

Behaviour and ecology
Its natural habitat is subtropical or tropical moist lowland forests. Like many flowerpeckers, it favours mistletoe for foraging.

References

plain flowerpecker
Birds of South China
Birds of Eastern Himalaya
Birds of Southeast Asia
plain flowerpecker